Homan was a station on the Chicago Transit Authority's Green Line. The station was located at Homan Avenue and Lake Street in the East Garfield Park neighborhood of Chicago. Homan was situated east of Pulaski and west of Kedzie. Homan opened in March 1894 and closed on January 9, 1994, when the entire Green Line closed for a renovation project. The station did not reopen with the rest of the Green Line on May 12, 1996.

Preservation and relocation
In 1997, the CTA began working with the Illinois Historic Preservation Division on a plan to preserve the historic station house by moving it two blocks west to Central Park Drive near the Garfield Park Conservatory for a new stop called Conservatory–Central Park Drive. The new station would create equal spacing between the stations at Kedzie and Pulaski but would no longer have a direct bus connection to the #82 Kimball-Homan bus route. This created some controversy in the East Garfield Park community because residents said that they would have to walk through a high crime area to get to the bus from the new station. This was also around the time when the CTA had also eliminated the #16 Lake Street bus which ran underneath the Green Line tracks. The bus route was eliminated on October 5, 1997, due to budget cuts. The neighborhood also felt that the community leaders and the Mayor favored tourists who would use the new station to visit the Garfield Park Conservatory over local residents who needed the station to be located near a bus route. On September 15, 1999, the CTA finished planning and released a project schedule to move the historic station house and use it to create a new station. The old Homan station was completely demolished by the spring of 2000, and put into storage to be later reconstructed at Central Park. Relocation of the former station house began in March 2001 and the project was finished on June 30, 2001, when the new station opened at Conservatory.

References

 

CTA Green Line stations
Railway stations in the United States opened in 1894
Railway stations closed in 1994
1894 establishments in Illinois
1994 disestablishments in Illinois
Defunct Chicago "L" stations